Dinskaya is a large rural locality (a stanitsa) and the administrative center of Dinskoy District in Krasnodar Krai, Russia. Population:

References

Rural localities in Krasnodar Krai
Dinskoy District
Kuban Oblast